Generations of Chinese leadership is a term historians use to characterize distinct periods of the leadership of the Chinese Communist Party (CCP) and, by extension, successive changes in the ideology of the CCP. Historians have studied various periods in the development of the government of the People's Republic of China by reference to these "generations".

Terminology
While in English the chronological leadership groups are commonly referred to as "generations of Chinese leadership", there is no exact equivalent expression in Chinese. The usual term in official discourse for such a group is a "leadership collective", which are counted in generations. Thus, for example, the "first generation" of leaders identified below are labelled as "the first generation leadership collective". In official discourse, they are also not viewed as leaders of the state (the People's Republic of China), but rather leaders of the party (the CCP).

In the CCP's official discourse, the "generational" division and identification of the "core leader" for each of the first, second and third generations was set down during the leadership of Jiang Zemin and first publicised in 1999. This division and identification was not uncontroversial at the time, since the party had hitherto regarded his immediate predecessors as the party's General Secretary, Hu Yaobang and Zhao Ziyang, as its leaders, and regarded Deng Xiaoping as the "power behind the throne" rather than a formal leader. The revision of party history into "generations" helped to secure Jiang's position as "core" and anointed heir. Through the invention of the concept of the "core", it also helped to de-legitimise Jiang's deposed predecessors (such as Hu and Zhao), by relegating them from party leader to mere "membership" of a "leadership collective", which also conveniently helped to legitimise their deposition.

Jiang's successors have maintained this generational division, but have retreated from identifying a "core leader" in the fourth generation, and the succeeding general secretary Hu Jintao has never been identified in official announcements as the "core" of the fourth generation, preferring to be simply called by his title "General Secretary". Xi Jinping did continue this practice until October 2016 when the 6th Plenary of the 18th Central Committee named him as the "core leader" in a document.

The "leadership collective" at any one time usually, but not always, correlates with the members of the Politburo Standing Committee of the Chinese Communist Party, with the leader of the party (the Chairman or, after 1982, the General Secretary) often, but not always, the leader of this leadership collective.

First generation

Although the first generation of leaders ruled collectively for only part of the period, and Mao Zedong was to a large extent a paramount leader for most of the period, the successive leaders from the founding of the People's Republic in 1949 until Mao's death and the dismantling of the power of his closest deputies in 1976 are now referred to retrospectively as the "first generation" of leaders in official discourse.

Thus, the first generation, from 1949 to 1976, consisted of Mao Zedong as core, along with Zhou Enlai, Zhu De (as informal triumvirate), Liu Shaoqi, Chen Yun, Deng Xiaoping, Peng Dehuai, and Lin Biao. These were the leaders that founded the People's Republic of China after the Communist victory in the Chinese Civil War. They were born between 1886 and 1907, although the Gang of Four were a distinct subgroup born 1914 to 1935. Most were born before the demise and fall of the Qing Dynasty (not including the Gang) and thus lived to see both the birth and, on the mainland, the end of the Republic of China. One heavy characteristic of these leaders were that they tended to be both political and military leaders.  Most had some education outside China, and their formative experiences included the Long March, Chinese Civil War and the Second Sino-Japanese War. The guiding political ideology from the first generations were general principles of Marxism and Mao Zedong Thought.

Of this group, Mao, Zhou, Zhu and Liu were the four original members of the collective leadership from 1949 until the political turmoil during the cultural revolution in the late 1960s, which resulted in Mao gaining paramount autocratic power and the fall of Liu. Liu, then the President (or "Chairman of the State"), was removed from his party position and stripped of the office of President in 1968 and died in prison the following year. Thus, Mao, Zhou and Zhu were the only three original members of the Politburo Standing Committee of the Chinese Communist Party who remained in the Politburo from 1945 until their deaths in 1976 (though Zhu temporarily lost his membership between 1969 and 1973) and died while holding the highest party and state offices Chairman of the Chinese Communist Party (Mao), Premier of the State Council (Zhou) and Chairman of the Standing Committee of the National People's Congress, the nominal head of state (Zhu). Since the three had the biggest contribution to the victory in the Chinese Civil War and the foundation of the People's Republic of China in 1949 they are now collectively venerated as the triumvirate of founding heroes.

With the demise of Liu, Mao promoted Lin Biao as his deputy, and the "Gang of Four" to fill the role of his trusted allies. Lin fell out of favour, however, and died in 1971 while attempting to escape to the Soviet Union. The Gang of Four, which consisted of Jiang Qing (Madame Mao), and three other members meteorically promoted in the late 1960s, were the only members of the first generation of leadership to remain after Mao's death in 1976. Their demise came shortly afterwards in a political coup managed by what became the second generation of leaders.

Of the other members identified above, Chen Yun was sidelined from the early 1960s, lost his party position in 1969, but survived to play an influential role in the second generation of leadership. Peng Dehuai was denounced in 1959, made a brief return to government in 1965, but was detained by Red Guards from 1966 and died in prison from torture and maltreatment in 1974. Deng Xiaoping, the core of the second generation of leadership, also played a key role in the first generation at various times, mainly as an ally of Zhou and Peng, but was purged from government in 1976 and remained sidelined at the time of Mao's death.

Second generation

The death of Mao, Zhou and Zhu in 1976, and soon afterwards the coup that resulted in the arrest of the Gang of Four, ushered in the era now identified as the "second generation" of leaders. The era began with Hua Guofeng as the successor to Mao, but his position was soon eclipsed by the ascendancy of Deng Xiaoping as the paramount leader, in which position he remained at least until 1989 when he resigned from his leadership positions. During this period the most power and influence had a group of old party veterans, known as the Eight Elders, whose main members were Li Xiannian and Chen Yun, together with Deng. All of them had more than 40 years of political experience.

Thus, in official discourse, the second generation of leadership lasted from 1976 to 1992. The official discourse of the CCP today identifies Deng Xiaoping as the "core" of this second generation, but Deng was never formally the leader of the party during this period. Instead, the formal party leaders during this time were, successively, Hua Guofeng, Hu Yaobang, Zhao Ziyang and Jiang Zemin. Other prominent leaders of this generation were Chen Yun, Li Xiannian, Ye Jianying, Peng Zhen and Wang Zhen. These leaders were also involved in the Chinese revolution, but with the exception of Deng Xiaoping, served in more junior roles, as they were all born from 1897 to 1921 (that is, some were born after the demise of the Qing Empire in the Xinhai Revolution). Like the first generation, many were educated overseas, particularly in France. Their young formative experiences were similar to the first generation. Most had some position of authority during the Cultural Revolution, although as a rule those that held power after the 1980s were purged during that decade. This generation turned the focus from class struggle and political movements to economic development and pioneering Chinese economic reform.

The dominant political ideology of the era was Deng Xiaoping Theory, which was accepted by the party in 1978, and he served in various leadership positions, although his paramount power was not overtly reflected in his formal titles. Instead, the formal leaders of the party were a series of younger leaders promoted (and then demoted) by Deng and other influential elders. The most prominent of these were Hu Yaobang (Party Chairman from 1981, General Secretary from 1982, demoted 1987, died 1989), and Zhao Ziyang (Premier from 1980, General Secretary from 1987, demoted and place under house arrest in 1989). They were replaced by Li Peng and Jiang Zemin, who would go on to become prominent members of the third generation of leaders.

Consistently influential behind the scenes during Deng's time as paramount leader were fellow elder statesmen Chen Yun and Li Xiannian. Other prominent elders were Ye Jianying (until his death in 1986), Deng Yingchao (Zhou Enlai's widow, until her death in 1992) and Peng Zhen (who retired in 1988). Yang Shangkun played a brief but important role in the period between 1989 and 1992, when as president he subverted the existing constitutional convention and turned the office of President from a symbolic role into an executive one.

The transition towards the third generation of leadership began with the Tiananmen Square protests of 1989. The purges that followed led to the promotion of what became the third generation of leadership. Soon afterwards, Deng resigned his last major party post, as chairman of the central military committee, although he remained influential behind the scenes until his death in 1997.

Third generation

Between 1989 and 1992, Jiang was believed to be simply a transitional figure to protect the party from a power vacuum (or even an Eastern Bloc style collapse) until a more stable successor government to Deng Xiaoping could be put in place. Because of this, the era of the "third generation" is not regarded to have begun until 1992, with the election of the new Politburo standing committee and Jiang consolidating his power without Deng.

Thus, the "third generation" lasted from 1992 to 2002, with Jiang Zemin as core, and other leaders including Li Peng, Zhu Rongji, Qiao Shi, Li Ruihuan, Liu Huaqing, Hu Jintao, Wei Jianxing, and Li Lanqing. These leaders were born before the revolution from 1924 to 1934 but were educated afterwards before the Sino-Soviet split. Most of them received education in the Soviet Union as engineers and entered the party initially as factory managers. As a result, many of them did not wield any significant political power prior to the 1980s, spending their time during the Cultural Revolution and its aftermath working for the civil infrastructure of the state and were protected from the purges, as opposed to their predecessors. Unlike their predecessors, there is a split between the political and military leadership. Their formative experiences included the Second Sino-Japanese War and the Korean War. This generation continued economic development while China saw the emergence of various serious social issues. The political ideological innovation officially associated with this period was Jiang's "Three Represents".

The initial members of the third generation were mostly survivors from before 1989, including Jiang Zemin, Li Peng (who continued as premier), Qiao Shi and Li Ruihuan. Notable changes to the leadership were the elevation of Zhu Rongji in place of Li Peng as premier in 1998 and the elevation of Hu Jintao as vice president. For the first time since 1982, the three centres of power of the presidency, the party general secretaryship and the chairmanship of the central military commission were concentrated in a single person, Jiang Zemin. This enabled him to declare himself the "core" of the third generation of leadership.

During this period, while Deng Xiaoping had retired from all leadership positions, he remained influential. In 1992, Deng's informal intervention ensured that market-orientated reforms were not halted by resurgent conservative elements. (See also Deng Xiaoping's southern tour) Deng also played an important role in nominating Hu Jintao as Jiang's successor as party secretary.

Fourth generation

2002 saw the first orderly transition of power in the Chinese Communist Party in accordance with rules on term limits. The new leaders were elected to the Communist Party's Politburo in November 2002, and took up their governmental positions in March 2003, while the most prominent of their "third generation" predecessors stepped down at the same time. But Hu Jintao did not become the chairman of the Central Military Commission until September 2004.

The Chinese Government considers the Hu-Wen administration to be a continuation of the Third generation, and the Xi-Li administration to be the start of the Fourth generation.

Thus, the era of the "fourth generation" is officially regarded to have begun in 2002, and lasted until 2012, when the next election for the party leadership occurred. The prominent leaders included Hu Jintao (as General Secretary), Wu Bangguo, Wen Jiabao, Jia Qinglin, Zeng Qinghong, Huang Ju, Wu Guanzheng, Li Changchun, Luo Gan, Xi Jinping, Li Keqiang, He Guoqiang, and Zhou Yongkang. It is also known as the "republican generation" or the Hu-Wen Administration. These were promoted to top leadership at the 16th Party Congress and remained in power until the 18th Party Congress in 2012. This generation of leaders, born mainly in the World War II years from 1939 to 1944, represented a new technocratic style governance and a less centralized political structure. The majority of this generation of leaders were engineers whose academic lives were disrupted by the Cultural Revolution and, unlike both their predecessors and likely successors, have spent very little time overseas. The dominant political ideology of this era was Hu's Scientific Development Concept and a goal for a Socialist Harmonious Society.

Fifth generation (current)

The fifth generation came to power at the 18th Party Congress in 2012, when Hu Jintao stepped down as CCP General Secretary and CMC Chairman. In the fifth generation, one sees fewer engineers and more management and finance majors, including successful entrepreneurs. Most of the fifth generation of civilian leadership, born in the postwar years 1945 to 1955, were educated at top Chinese universities. Former leader Hu Jintao's Communist Youth League faction, and the Crown Prince Party (or "Princelings") are seen to be the two dominant factions within the leadership.

Following his elevation to General Secretary of the Chinese Communist Party and Chairman of the Central Military Commission, which oversees the Chinese Communist Party and the People's Liberation Army, the Princeling and current CCP General Secretary Xi Jinping succeeded Hu Jintao as the paramount leader of this generation. Premier Li Keqiang took the place of former Premier Wen Jiabao. Others who have been top figures in the 5th generation include Congress Chairmen Zhang Dejiang and Li Zhanshu, Conference Chairmen Yu Zhengsheng and Wang Yang, Secretariat First Secretaries Liu Yunshan and Wang Huning, Vice President and former Discipline Secretary Wang Qishan, Discipline Secretary Zhao Leji, first Vice Premiers Zhang Gaoli and Han Zheng, former Vice President Li Yuanchao, and its leading females, former Vice Premier Liu Yandong and current Vice Premier Sun Chunlan.

After the 20th National Congress in 2022, the prominent leaders included Xi Jinping, Li Qiang, Zhao Leji, Wang Huning, Cai Qi, Ding Xuexiang and Li Xi.

Sixth generation
The sixth generation of leaders had been expected to come to power at the 20th Party Congress in 2022. However, following Xi Jinping's consolidation of power at the 19th Party Congress, the future of the "sixth generation" was cast into doubt as clear successor figures failed to be named to senior leadership posts, particularly the Politburo Standing Committee. Xi Jinping was re-elected as the General Secretary of the Chinese Communist Party in 2022.

In preceding years, Hu Chunhua (now a Vice-Premier) was seen as a possible core figure. Hu and Sun Zhengcai were the only Politburo members named at the 18th Party Congress in 2012 who were born after 1960, making their further advancement seem like a certainty, but Sun was purged before the 19th Party Congress and Hu was dropped from the Politburo at the 20th. U.S.-based newspaper Duo Wei Times also listed Fujian Governor Su Shulin (since then fallen from grace), President of the Supreme People's Court Zhou Qiang, Heilongjiang Party Secretary Zhang Qingwei, and former Minister of Natural Resources Lu Hao as other potential figures in this generation of leadership. Others in this rough age group ascending in the ranks include Zhang Guoqing (party secretary of Liaoning) and Chen Min'er (party secretary of Chongqing).

Ding Xuexiang is the only person from this age bracket to have reached the Standing Committee,
but the 20th Politburo includes eight other members born between 1960 and 1964.

Timeline

See also 

 Paramount leader
 Leadership core
 Politics of the People's Republic of China
 Political position ranking of the People's Republic of China
 History of the People's Republic of China

References 

Politics of China
History of the People's Republic of China
Cultural generations
Ideology of the Chinese Communist Party